Kalyana Parisu is a 2014 Indian Tamil-language soap opera that airs on Sun TV. It is 2nd longest running Tamil soap opera with 1840 episodes. This show is produced by Vision Time India Pvt Ltd and directed by Harish Adhitya. It premiered on 10 February 2014 and ended on 27 March 2020 for 1836 episodes.

The first season focused on Gayathri, Subbulakshmi and Surya, who were married. The second season premiered on 10 September 2018 and ended on 27 March 2020 for 1836 episodes. The second season sequel and next generation story of Kalyana Parisu 1 reflect the lives of Vidhya and Ashok (son of Gayathri).

Series overview

Plot
Season 1
This season is a family and triangular love story. Gayathri (B.R Neha),  (Shruthi) and Renuka (Akila) are good friends, but their friendship does not last long. Surya (Eshwar Raghunathan) is married to both Subbulakshmi and Gayathri, due to unexpected circumstances. How life turns chaotic for all three is the story.

 Season 2
This season is a village family romance revenge story. Vidya (Srithika Saneesh) strives to take care of her family while working at Ashok (Arnav)'s home. Though she is in love with her childhood friend Ashok, he does not understand Vidya and his stepmother Subbulakshmi (Vanitha Krishnachandran)'s feelings and wants to marry Shwetha (Keerthi Jai Dhanush) who falls in love with him. Later he marries Vidya due to unexpected circumstances. How Ashok and Vidhya live together is the story.

Cast

Season 1 (2014–2018) 
Main cast
 Neha Ramakrishna Gowda as Gayathri Surya (Surya's 1st wife)
Sridevi Ashok (2014-2018) replacement Sruthi Shanmugha Priya (2018) as Subbulakshmi Surya (Surya's 2nd wife)
 Eshwar Ragunathan as Surya Dharmalingam( Gowtham 's brother,Gayathri and Subbulakshmi's husband)
 M. Amulaya (2014-2016) replacement Akila Raghavan (2016-2018) as Renuka Suresh (Gayathri and Subbulakshmi's friend)
 Master Bidami Shah as Ashok Surya (Gayathri's son) and Gautham Surya (Subbulakshmi' son) (Dual Roles) (2017-2018)

Additional cast
Sadhana as Gomathy Dharmalingam (Gowtham and Surya,Vanitha's mother;Died in serial)
Andrews Jesudoss as Dharmalingam (Gowtham and Surya,Vanitha's father)
Srividhya Nanjan as Vanitha Azhaguraja (Gowtham and Surya's sister)
Guhan Shanmugam as Azhaguraja (Vanitha's husband)
 Gajesh as Dhandapany (Renuka's assistant)
 Ravi Varma as Suresh (Renuka's husband)
 Narasimha Raju  as Annamalai (Gayathri's father)
 Dharini as Lakshmi Annamalai (Gayathri's mother)
 Gokul as Selvam (Subbu's elder brother)
 Sri Kala Parmasivam as Rani Selvam(Selvam's wife)
 Sudha as Suresh's mother
 Anuradha as Rajalakshmi (Prasad's aunt)
Sathyapriya as Thirupurasundari Rajamanickam (Dharmalingam's sister, Mallika's mother)
Bombay Babu as Rajamanickam (Thirupurasundari's husband, Mallika's father)

Former cast
Arun Kumar Rajan as Gowtham Dharmalingam (Surya's brother;died in serial)
 Sai Swetha as Vaishali 
 --- as Ramana 
 --- as Gurukkal (Temple priest, died in the serial)
 Lakshmi Narayanan as Gowri 
 Krish as Rajadurai (Vaishali's husband, died in the serial)
 Krithika  as Sandhya (died in the serial)
 Sreeja as Anbarasi Prasad 
 Pollachi Babu as Anbarasi's brother
 Sangeetha Shetty as Tara 
 Manush Manhmohan as Prasad
 B. Jayalakshmi as Angala Parameshwari 
 --- as Vasanth (Anbarasi's former lover, died in the serial)
 Jeyamani as Rangarajan, Mutaiyah's father (died in the serial) 
 Srilatha as Paravathi Rangarajan(Muthaiyah's mother)
Deepa Nethran as Sathish's mother 
 Sunitha as Abhinaya (Abhi), Muthiya's sister
 Kalaranjini as Gajalakshmi
 Bhavani as Lakshmi Annamalai (Replaced by Dharini) 
 Nalini as Hostel Warden

Season 2 (2018–2020)
Main cast
Srithika Saneesh as Vidhya Ashok (Arjun and Lakshmi's first daughter)
Arnav as Ashok Surya (Surya and Gayathri's son) and Gowtham Surya @ Rocky (Surya and Subbulaksmi's son)
Keerthi Jai Dhanush as Swetha Arjun (Arjun and Shyamala Devi's daughter)(Main Antagonist)

Recurring Cast
Swathi Reddy as Kalyani Vetrimaran (Vidhya's sister, Arjun and Lakshmi's middle daughter) 
Pandi Kamal as Vetrimaran Ramanathan (Kalyani's husband, Vishalakshi and Ramanathan's son)
R.Poongkodi as Dharani Azhaguraja (Vanitha and Azhaguraja's daughter)
Sumangali as Vishalakshi Ramanathan (Vetrimaran's mother) 
   as Mani (Vishalakshi's elder brother, Vetrimaran's uncle)
 Shanthi as Lakshmi Arjun (Vidhya's, Kalyani's & Vasuki's mother)
 Sathish as Arjun (Vidya, Vasuki, Kalyani and Swetha's father, Lakshmi and Shyamala's husband)
Shilpa as Shyamala Devi Arjun (Swetha's mother)
 Nivedhitha Pankaj as Vasuki (Vidhya's younger sister, Arjun and Lakshmi's youngest daughter)  
 Sai Gopi as Sundaram (Lakshmi's brother; Saravanan's father) 
 "Bhandham" Saval Ram as Suruli (Sundaram's assistant)
 Suruli as Swami (Shyamala's assistant)  
"Ahalya Mali" as Nathuram Settu (Poonam and Malini's father)(Antagonist)
 Karthick as Saravanan Sundaram (Geetha's husband, Sundaram and Karpagam's son)
 Asritha Kingini as Geetha Saravanan (Saravanan's wife, Mallika and Ramachandran's daughter)
Chandrasekharan as Naidu (Rocky's adoptive uncle)
 Karthick Raj as Mugundhan

Former cast
 Neha Gowda as Thayamma @ Gayathri Surya (Surya's 1st wife, Ashok's mother) (Replaced by Gayathri Devi)
Shruthi Shanmugam Priya as Subbulakshmi Surya (Surya's 2nd wife, Ashok's step-mother and Gautham's mother) (Replaced by Vanitha Krishnachandran)
Eshwar Raghunathan as Surya Dharmalingam (Gayathri and Subbulakshmi's husband, Ashok and Gautham's father, Died in serial)
Shari as Gomathy Dharmalingam (Surya's mother, Ashok and Gautham's grandmother, Died in serial)
R.Poongkodi as Vanitha Azhaguraja (Surya's sister, Dharani's mother Died in serial)
Guhan Shanmugam as Azhaguraja (Dharani's father)
Saithra Gruthika as Kalyani (Vidhya's sister) (Replaced by Swathi Reddy)
--- as Valli (Swetha's spy)
---- as Poonam (died in serial)
---- as Vimal (Poonam's fiancé)
Sathyapriya as Thirupurasundari Rajamanickam (Dharmalingam's sister and Mallika's mother) 
Ranjini  Pradeep as Malini (Poonam's elder sister, Died in serial)
C. Ranganathan as Ramanathan (Vetrimaran's father, Died in serial)
Gayathri Devi as Gayathri Surya @Thayamma (Surya's 1st wife, Ashok's mother and Gautham's step mother) 
Vanitha Krishnachandran as Subbulaksmi Surya (Surya's 2nd wife, Gautham's  mother And Ashok's step mother)
 Androos Jesudas as Dharmalingam (Surya's father, Ashok and Gautham's grandfather)
 Ravikanth as Dhandapaany (Thayamma's assistant)
Vinod as Ranjith (Geetha's Ex fiancée)  
 Issac Varkees as Ramachandran (Mallika's husband, Geetha's father) 
 Mona Bedre as Mallika Ramachandran (Thirupurasundari and Rajamanickam's daughter)
 Priya as Karpagam Sundaram (Saravanan's mother)
 Kavya Varshini as Valli (Saravanan's elder sister) 
 Birla Bose as Valli's husband

Casting
Season 1
Season 1 is a family story produced by Vision Time Pvt Ltd which airs on Sun TV. Kannada TV actress Neha Gowda was selected to portray the lead role of Gayathri. Sridevi was chosen after her great performances in many shows on Tamil television. Later Sruthi Shanmuga Priya replaced the role of Subbulakshmi in Episode 1080. Amulaya makes her debut in Tamil serials as Renukha. Later Akila replaced the role of Renukha in Episode 440. Eshwar was selected to portray the lead role of Surya. Sreeja of Bommalattam serial fame was selected to portray the main role of Anbarasi in Episode 1198. Other supporting cast members include Sadhana, Narasimha Raju, Anuradha, Sudha, Kalaranjini and Bhavani

Season 2
Season 2 is a village family romance revenge story. Srithika Saneesh was selected to portray the new lead role of Vidhya, who is known for the serials Nadhaswaram and Kula Deivam. Arnav was chosen due to his performance in Sakthi and Keladi Kanmani. Other supporting cast members include Vanitha Krishnachandran, Shanthi, Sathyapriya, Androos Jesudas, Birla Bose and C. Ranganathan.

Production
The series was directed by R.Nandhakumar, A.Ramachandran, A.P.Rajendhiran, P.Selvam and Ponnai G.G.Madhan. It was produced by Vision Time, along with the production crew of 2007–2019.

 Editors: M.S.Thiyagarajan, Manikandan Ravi, M.N.Perumal, G. Sakthi Vel
 Cinematography: S.Gunasekar, E.Manikandan, M.Raja
 Producer: Vaidehi Ramamurthy
 Dialogues: Joegeorge, Pa.Raghavan, P.R.Dhakshina Moorthy

Soundtrack
The title song was written by lyricist Vairamuthu, composed C. Sathya and sung by Rita. The song was released on 10 February 2014 on Sun TV and on Vision Time's  official YouTube channel on 8 August 2014.

Ratings 
Kalyana Parisu attracted high and low viewership ratings in India during its broadcast in 2014. It started with positive reviews and a good TRP rating, but then gained critical reviews and a low rating. The show's official YouTube channel has 20000+ - 2 lakhs views for all the episodes combined as of August 2017.

References

External links 
 Official website 

Sun TV original programming
Tamil-language romance television series
2010s Tamil-language television series
2014 Tamil-language television series debuts
2018 Tamil-language television seasons
Tamil-language television shows
2020 Tamil-language television series endings